Veal is an English surname, arriving to England from the Norman conquest in 1066. Notable people with the surname include:

Coot Veal (1932–2021), American baseball player
Demetrin Veal (born 1981), American football player
Donnie Veal (born 1984), American baseball player
Jack Veal, Child actor
Jennifer Veal (born 1991), English actress
Kristen Veal (born 1981), Australian basketball player
Rohan Veal (born 1977), Australian sailor

References

English-language surnames
Surnames of English origin